Victoria Schmidt is a New Zealand theater, film and television actress. She is most known for her role as Aaliyah in Sione's Wedding (2006). She is also a playwright.

Biography
Schmidt was born and raised in South Auckland, New Zealand and is of Samoan descent. Her parents are Samoan immigrants Fred Bismarck Schmidt and Agnes Schmidt (née Wright). She graduated in 2007 with a Bachelor of Performing and Screen Arts from Unitec Institute of Technology in Auckland.

She has appeared in Sione's Wedding, Running With The Bulls, Othello Polynesia, Tautai and The Factory. Her first full-length, professionally produced play was Music and Me, which was staged at the Mangere Arts Centre in 2012. She both wrote and appeared in the play.

Personal life
Schmidt is based in the United States and divides her time between Los Angeles, California, and New Hampshire. She is also the niece of professional Samoan bodybuilder and former 1995 Masters Olympia Sonny Schmidt and the grand-niece of the former Minister of Labour for Samoa; Polataivao Fosi Schmidt.

References

External links

New Zealand people of German descent
New Zealand people of Samoan descent
Actresses of Samoan descent
Unitec Institute of Technology alumni
People from Auckland
Living people
Year of birth missing (living people)